The 1898 Michigan State Normal Normalites football team represented Michigan State Normal School (later renamed Eastern Michigan University) during the 1898 college football season.  In their first and only season under head coach Enoch Thorne, the Normalites compiled a record of 1–5–2, failed to score in five of eight games played, and were outscored by their opponents by a combined total of 100 to 19. Fred Q. Gorton was the team captain.

Enrollment at Michigan State Normal reached 915 students in October 1898.

Schedule

References

Michigan State Normal
Eastern Michigan Eagles football seasons
Michigan State Normal Normalites football